In the game of bridge, Ekren refers to a preemptive opening of 2 defined as 4-4, 4-5, 5-4 or 5-5 in the majors and 3-10 high card points. This conventional preempt was designed by Bjørn Olav Ekren from Norway and is an example of the modern style of highly aggressive preemptive bidding.

Responses
Responses to a 2 Ekren opening:

Pass = to play (can be a tactical manoeuvre in the absence of a major suit fit and does not guarantee long diamonds)
2/ = to play
2NT = relay (invitational or stronger)
3 = natural, not forcing
3 = invitational with 3-3 in the majors
3/ = preemptive, to play
4/ = to play

In responding to the 2NT relay the opener indicates whether he holds a minimum or a maximum (because of their playing strength 5-5's are generally considered maximum), and - in case of a maximum - the distribution in the majors:

3 = any minimum (responder's 3/ rebid now indicates an invite)
3 = 5-5 min or max (creates game force)
3 = 4-5 max (creates game force)
3 = 5-4 max (creates game force)
3NT = 4-4 max (creates game force)

Modifications

Variants of Ekren include the use of the 2 opening to indicate a weak hand with at least a 4-4 in the majors. This treatment has the advantage that the left hand opponent of the opener can hardly gamble on the fact that (s)he will get a second chance to bid.

Another variant that is popular in the Netherlands (where it is referred to as Tilburg Two) and Belgium is to accommodate the Ekren hands as a weak variant in the strong 2 opening. This leaves untouched the 2// openings which are commonly utilised in the Low countries as Multi 2 diamonds and Muiderberg (also known as Tartan or 'Jón og Símon') openings. Also, a 2 relay is now available to responder that can be used to ask for the longest (or better) of the two major suits.

References

Bridge conventions